Louis Joliet Mall is a shopping mall in Joliet, Illinois.  Its anchor stores are JCPenney, Macy's (formerly Marshall Field's) and a Cinemark movie theater along with two vacant anchors last occupied by Carson's and Sears. It also has a TGI Fridays.

History
The mall barely escaped destruction in 1990 when the Plainfield Tornado passed within a few hundred yards of the southwest entrance. Some shoppers report seeing nothing but a huge, black wall when they looked to the southwest. In 1991, Circuit City opened outside of the mall. The chain went bankrupt in 2009. It was replaced by hhgregg in 2011. Six years later in 2017, hhgregg filed for bankruptcy as well. It was replaced by Binny's Beverage Depot in the fall of 2018.

Panera Bread opened at the mall in December 2000.

The Marshall Field's store was officially renamed Macy's on September 9, 2006.

Tilted Kilt opened in 2011, but closed in early 2017. On October 29, 2019, Cajun Boil & Bar opened in its former spot.

H&M and Pandora opened in December 2014.

In 2015, Sears Holdings spun off 235 of its properties, including the Sears at Louis Joliet Mall, into Seritage Growth Properties.

On February 16, 2017, MC Sports announced that all 66 stores would be closing. That same year, a Home2 Suites by Hilton hotel was built outside of the mall.

On April 18, 2018, it was announced that Carson's will close as the parent, Bon-Ton Stores, was going out of business. The store closed on August 29, 2018. On August 2, 2018, it was announced that the Senior Services of Will County might move into the former  Bernger-Weise/Carson's space.

On October 15, 2018, it was announced that Sears would also be closing as part of a plan to close 142 stores nationwide. The store closed sometime in 2019 which left JCPenney, Macy's, and Cinemark as the only anchor stores left.

Bus route 
Pace: 507 Plainfield

See also

References

External links
 

buildings and structures in Joliet, Illinois
economy of Joliet, Illinois
shopping malls in Illinois
shopping malls in Will County, Illinois